Singleton is a village, Anglican parish and civil parish in the Chichester district of West Sussex, England. It lies in the Lavant valley,  miles north of Chichester on the A286 road to Midhurst.

The village name is derived from the Anglo-Saxon 'sengel', which means "burnt clearing".

In the 2001 census there were 199 households containing 476 people, of whom 199 were economically active. The population marginally increased to 480 at the 2011 Census.

History
The village name is derived from the Anglo-Saxon 'sengel', which means "burnt clearing".

Singleton (Silletone) was listed in the Domesday Book (1086) as the ancient hundred of the same name with 237 households including the settlements of East Lavant, Mid Lavant, Binderton and Preston. In Singleton parish itself there were 167 households: 89 villagers, 58 smallholders and 20 slaves; with ploughing land, woodland, meadows, three mills and a church, it had a value to the lords of the manor of £121.

Between 1880 and 1953 a railway served the village at Singleton station. The station complex is now a private dwelling.

Landmarks

Parish church

The Anglican parish church has Anglo-Saxon nave walls and massive square tower. The aisles were added later. This was a hundredal church, the central church of the Hundred of Singleton, a Saxon administrative grouping of parishes. The tower has three Saxon windows and a Saxon doorway leading into thin air high up in the nave, showing that there was once an upper room above the nave. It is likely that the priests for the churches in the hundred would have lived in this room. The Saxon tower arch was rebuilt in the twelfth or thirteenth century with a pointed arch. The pews are from the Tudor period. The church is a Grade I listed building.

Goodwood

Goodwood Country Park lies in the south of the parish, part of the Goodwood House estate.

Weald and Downland Museum

The Weald and Downland Living Museum of Historic Buildings is situated on the edge of the village. Over 40 historic buildings from south-east England have been rescued from destruction, dismantled and reconstructed on the site. Since 2017 it has been the location of the BBC television series The Repair Shop.

Singleton forest oil well
There is an oil well in Singleton forest in the north of the parish. This is one of 84 wells on DECC’s list for East and West Sussex, some dating back over 100 years.

There have been two pollution incidents at the Singleton Oil Field (now operated by IGas but operated by a different company when the incidents occurred). These occurred in the early 1990s, and were caused by failure of cement behind the conductor and the 9 5/8-inch casing. This was identified as a result of five groundwater monitoring boreholes installed at the Singleton Oil Field in 1993. The leak was from the well cellar (cement-lined cavity in which the well-head sits) via the preinstalled conductor and the 9 5/8-inch casing, both of which appear not to have been adequately cemented in-situ in at least one well. A thorough investigation commenced in 1997, including the drilling of a number (>11) of additional boreholes, and the carrying out of tracer tests and CCTV examination under the auspices of, and in consultation with, the UK Environment Agency. The leak paths, once identified and verified, were remediated. Monitoring has continued since that time and the observed pollution levels have remained below those set by the Environment Agency as requiring further action.

References

External links 

Further historical information and sources on GENUKI
British History Online: Singleton

Villages in West Sussex
Chichester District